The first election for the Legislative Council of Griqualand West were held in November 1873. Griqualand West had been established as a British Crown colony in January 1873. Of the 8 members of the Legislative Council 4 were elected.

Constituency results

Kimberley

Barkly

Hay

References

1873 elections in Africa
Elections in South Africa
Parliamentary election